KAMM may refer to:

 KAMM-LP, a former television station licensed to Amarillo, Texas, United States
 KFGM-FM, a radio station (101.5 FM) licensed to serve Frenchtown, Montana, United States, which held the call sign KAMM-FM from 2016 to 2022